Gerd Pfeiffer (22 December 1919 – 1 February 2007) was a German jurist who served as the fourth President of the Federal Court of Justice of West Germany from 1977 to 1987.

Biography 
In March 1937, Pfeiffer finished his Abitur and was recruited into the Reich Labour Service (German: Reichsarbeitsdienst, abbr. RAD) in Breslau. From 1937 onwards he completed his mandatory service in the Wehrmacht. After the start of World War II in 1939, he served in the Heer until 1945. He was wounded five times. After the war ended, he studied law at the University of Erlangen-Nuremberg from 1945 to 1948. In 1948, he was promoted to Dr. iur. by the university faculty. After passing the second Staatsexamen in 1951, he entered into judicial service in Bavaria. Following that, he served as a scientific employee at the Federal Constitutional Court (German: Bundesverfassungsgericht, abbr. BVG) from 1952 to 1958, being promoted to judge at the Landgericht München I and later at the Supreme District Court in Munich.

On 7 April 1966, Pfeiffer was appointed Federal Judge. He was delegated the I. Punitive Senate of the Federal Court of Justice, becoming president of that senate on 5 March 1970. On 3 November 1976, he was appointed the Vice President of the Federal Court of Justice, and less than a year later, on 1 October 1977, he was appointed the court's President, succeeding Robert Fischer. Additionally, he became the chairman of the Cartel Senate of the court.

In 1979, he was named the speaker of a celebration for the centenary of the Reich Court (German: Reichsgericht), where he gained notoriety for successfully defending the conservative tradition of the court before 1933, while at the same time denouncing Nazi excesses committed through the judicial system and describing the changes to the legal system since 1945.

For his judicial competency and determination, he became well-respected as an expert in criminal law. Using his abilities as the head of the Ethics Commission of Freiburg, as well as the chairman of the scientific council of the exposition "Justice and National Socialism" (German: Justiz und Nationalsozialismus) in 1989. He opposed the toughening-up of existing criminal law in a way he believed to be disproportionate. Additionally, he oppsed the policy on turn state's evidence pursued by the then-Federal Minister of the Interior Friedrich Zimmermann. During his tenure, Pfeiffer published, among other things, the Karlsruhe Commentary to the Code of Criminal Procedure (German: Karlsruher Kommentar zur Strafprozeßordnung).

He retired on 31 December 1987 from his position as President of the Federal Court of Justice. He was succeeded by Walter Odersky. He was the first member of the Social Democratic Party of Germany (SPD) to become president of that court.

From 1988 to 1993, he was the Chairman of the Supportive Association for the Legal History Museum (German: Trägervereins für das Rechtshistorische Museum) in Karlsruhe.

Honours 
 Federal Cross of Merit
 Bavarian Cross of Merit
 Grand Decoration of Honour in Gold with Sash of Austria
 Grand Cross of the Order of Merit of the Italian Republic
 Badge of Honour of the German Advocacy
 Iron Cross

Bibliography 
 Klaus Tiedemann, Otto-Friedrich Freiherr von Gamm, Peter Raisch: Strafrecht, Unternehmensrecht, Anwaltsrecht. Festschrift für Gerd Pfeiffer. Zum Abschied aus dem Amt als Präsident des Bundesgerichtshofes. Heymann, Köln u. a. 1988, ISBN 3-452-20938-5.
 Thomas Fischer: Gerd Pfeiffer † 1. Februar 2007. Nachruf. In: Journal der Juristischen Zeitgeschichte. 1. Jahrgang, Heft 3, 2007, S. 101–103.

External links 
 
 Prof. Dr. Gerd Pfeiffer wird 85 Jahre alt
 Ex-BGH-Präsident Pfeiffer ist tot
 Eintrag auf Seiten des Bundesgerichtshofes

References 

1919 births
2007 deaths
Judges of the Federal Court of Justice